Tanzania– Zambia relations are bilateral relations between Tanzania and Zambia. Tanzania and Zambia are one of the oldest allies in the region and together formed the front line nations for independence for neighboring African nations.

Trade and economy 
The balance of trade between the two nations is very stable and in 2013 Tanzania exported $92.7 million worth of goods to Zambia. Zambia imports various products from Tanzania, mainly machinery, building material and processed foods. On the other hand, Zambia exported $71.4 million worth of goods in 2013, mainly agriculture products such as corn and copper products.

Infrastructure 
Zambia is a landlocked country and most of its goods are exported and imported through the Port of Dar es Salaam. Mainly Vehicles and Refined oil is transported from Dar es Salaam to Zambia and Copper is transported from Zambia to the port.

Tazama pipeline 

The Tazama pipeline was built in 1968 and is a 1,710 km pipeline spanning from TIPER refinery in Dar es Salaam and the Indeni refinery in Ndola, Zambia. The pipeline is designed to carry 1.1 million tonnes per year and is owned by the Tazama Pipeline Limited. The company is jointly owned by the Government of Zambia (66.7%) and Government of Tanzania (33.3%).

TAZARA railway 

The TAZARA is a single-track railway and is 1,860 km long and was built between 1970 and 1975. The Project was entirely funded by the Chinese and was the largest foreign aid project by China at the time. The railway was built to reduce economic dependence of Zambia on Rhodesia and South Africa, which was ruled by white minority government. The Railway is primarily used to transport Zambian copper to the Port of Dar es salaam. The railway faced various operational difficulties since its incorporation and has always struggled to make a profit, however, in recent years both countries have stepped up efforts to ensure the sustainability of the company.

Diplomatic relations
Both nations are part of the Southern African Development Community and Zambians and Tanzanians do not need visas to travel to each other's respective countries for Tourism purposes. Tanzania maintains an embassy in Lusaka and Zambia maintains an embassy in Dar es Salaam.

State visits
24 February 2015 – Jakaya Kikwete makes a two-day state visit to Lusaka, where he held closed door talks with Edgar Lungu.
27 November 2016 - Edgar Lungu made a two-day state visit to Dar-es-salaam, where he held bilateral talks with John Magufuli.
3 August 2022 - Hakainde Hichilema made a one-day state visit to Dar es Salaam, where he held bilateral talks with Samia Suluhu Hassan

See also  
 Foreign relations of Tanzania
 Foreign relations of Zambia

References

External links 

 
Zambia
Tanzania